Vinkeveen is a village in the Dutch province of Utrecht. It is a part of the municipality of De Ronde Venen, and lies about 18 km south of Amsterdam.

Vinkeveen used to be a separate municipality. It merged with Waverveen in 1841, to form the municipality Vinkeveen en Waverveen. In 1989 there was a reorganisation of local governments, and Vinkeveen became a part of De Ronde Venen.

Vinkeveen is best known for the Vinkeveense Plassen (Lakes of Vinkeveen), an area of lakes and sand islands east of the village. It is an important recreational area, with facilities for swimming, diving and yachting. A permit is required for recreational diving in the lake. There is a marina on the north shore of the lakes.

History 
It was first mentioned between 1395 and 1396 as Vinkenveen, and means "moorland with low quality peat". The village started as a peat excavation settlement. In 1840, it was home to 903 people. The Catholic Holy Heart Church was built between 1880 and 1883.

Gallery

References

Populated places in Utrecht (province)
Former municipalities of Utrecht (province)
De Ronde Venen